The Cape Final Trail is a hiking trail on the North Rim of the Grand Canyon National Park, located in the U.S. state of Arizona.

Description
It is located on the Walhalla Plateau at the Grand Canyon's North Rim. Access to this part of the park by car is seasonal, traditionally open from mid-May to mid-October or depending on snowcover from the previous winter.

No water is available (even at the trailhead), except early in the season by melting snow.  Otherwise all water needed must be carried for the duration of the hike.

Camping
The Grand Canyon Backcountry Use Plan designates the area along this trail (use area NA1) for At-Large Camping, with a valid permit. One can be obtained from the Backcountry Information Center, located just north of the North Rim Campground along State Route 67. There are good campsites along the last half mile of this trail.

See also

 The Grand Canyon
 List of trails in Grand Canyon National Park
 Greenland Lake

References

External links
 Grand Canyon National Park, Official site

Grand Canyon, North Rim
Grand Canyon, Walhalla Plateau
Hiking trails in Grand Canyon National Park